No Sanctuary is the first album by the British crust punk band Amebix. It was released in November 1983 through Spiderleg Records. It entered the independent albums chart at number 12 on 26 November 1983.

The album was re-released as part of the compilation No Sanctuary: The Spiderleg Recordings in 2008 on Alternative Tentacles.

The cover is a photograph by Dmitri Baltermants called "Grief". It depicts a 1942 Nazi massacre of Jews in the Crimean city of Kerch.

Track listing

Personnel
 The Baron Rockin von Aphid (Rob Miller) — bass, vocals
 Stig Da Pig (Chris Miller) — guitar
 Virus (Neil Worthington) — drums
 Norman — keyboard

References 

1983 albums
1983 debut albums
Amebix albums